Gentian Begeja (born 23 June 1973 in Durrës) is an Albanian former football player and coach who spent his entire career with Teuta Durrës

Managerial career
Begeja succeeded Gentian Stojku as coach of Erzeni Shijak in February 2019.

References

External links

1973 births
Living people
Footballers from Durrës
Albanian footballers
Association football midfielders
Association football forwards
KF Teuta Durrës players
KS Shkumbini Peqin players
Kategoria Superiore players
Albanian football managers
KF Teuta Durrës managers
Besa Kavajë managers